WBIG (1470 AM) was a radio station in Greensboro, North Carolina, United States, which broadcast from 1926 to 1986. It was last owned by the Jefferson-Pilot Communications Corporation (JP) and was its first broadcasting property. The company shut it down because of an insufficient signal to cover a growing radio market, competition from FM stations, and the rising value of the land it occupied.

History

Early years

Wayne M. Nelson built the station as WNRC, and it began broadcasting on August 19, 1926; studios were at the O. Henry Hotel in Greensboro. However, while the station had been established in Greensboro in 1926, it had in actuality moved from Charlotte, where it had been established as WJBG on October 1, 1925. W. Harold Essex, a later manager of the WSJS stations in Winston-Salem and one-time president of the National Association of Broadcasters, started his broadcasting career at WBIG in 1927. Originally operating as a 500-watt station on a frequency of 1340 kHz, WNRC moved to 1440 kHz as a result of General Order 40 in November 1928. In 1929, Nelson considered moving the station to Winston-Salem but withdrew the application.

In 1930, WNRC was acquired by the North Carolina Broadcasting Company, owned by Tennessee hotelier J. B. Pound; the call letters were changed to WBAM on September 23 and then to WBIG on October 14. (The new call sign was also said to stand for "We Believe in Greensboro".) The transmitter site was moved from the O. Henry—where the studios would remain until 1956—to the Jefferson Standard Building in downtown Greensboro, and daytime power was raised to 1,000 watts in 1932.

Jefferson-Pilot purchase
The 1930 transmitter site move would turn out to be critical to the station's future history. By 1934, WBIG was on the verge of going broke; it had already been briefly placed in receivership three years prior. Joseph M. Bryan, a fairly new employee of Jefferson-Pilot, persuaded a reluctant Julian Price, head of the insurance company, to enter the broadcast business by buying the radio station that was already in its building.

The move would turn out to be a profitable one for JP. An official company history noted that it bought WBIG "on Mr. Bryan's recommendation, and during the years that followed, he was able to report annually to the Jefferson Standard Directors that profits from the station equaled 100 percent of the original investment". More than a decade later, Bryan and Price purchased another radio station, WBT in Charlotte, and the firm went on to own radio and television station properties until the 2000s.

WBIG grew rapidly under its new ownership. It joined CBS; in 1939, it was approved to increase its power to 5,000 watts from a new site on Battleground Road. The station moved to 1470 kHz in 1941, along with other stations on 1440, when the reallocation of NARBA came into effect. The 1950s and 1960s were its heyday; popular morning man Bob Poole was an announcer at the station for 25 years, his career only ending shortly before his death of a heart attack in 1978. However, younger listeners gravitated to the Top 40-formatted WCOG.

Closure and reuse of the frequency
Falling ratings and an inability to compete with FM radio stations led Jefferson-Pilot to shut down the station and its news/adult contemporary format. Its 16 workers were given notice on the afternoon of November 20, 1986; three hours later, WBIG was history. Wallace Jorgenson, the president of Jefferson-Pilot, told Radio & Records that the Triad had outgrown the station's signal, which only reliably covered Greensboro and Guilford County.

The license was handed back to the FCC, though JP had attempted to give it away to a nonprofit organization to no avail. In 1992, a Lowe's home improvement store was constructed on the former transmitter site off Battleground Avenue; the year before, JP had sold the retailer the land for $3.65 million.

In 1994, Walt Cockerham announced that he would open WWBG on the 1470 frequency. Its planned format and call sign were a tribute to the original WBIG, the call sign having been adopted in the interim at an AM radio station in Aurora, Illinois (still WBIG). It was then purchased by Stuart Epperson, founder of Salem Communications, and started broadcasting in 1999.

References

BIG
Greensboro, North Carolina
Radio stations established in 1926
1926 establishments in North Carolina
Radio stations disestablished in 1986
1986 disestablishments in North Carolina
Defunct mass media in North Carolina
Defunct radio stations in the United States